Sustainable Agriculture Research and Education or (SARE) is a competitive grant program established by the USDA agency, the Cooperative State Research, Education, and Extension Service. The program is subdivided into regional areas (North Central, Northeast, South, and West), each with their own leadership. The purpose of SARE is to promote research and education on sustainable agriculture practices and ensure the economic viability of the agricultural industry in the United States for future generations.

Mission

"SARE's mission is to advance, to the whole of American agriculture, innovations that improve profitability, stewardship and quality of life by investing in groundbreaking research and education."

History

Beginnings
Congress created the Agricultural Productivity Act in response to the need for government establishment of a sustainable agriculture program in 1985. In 1988, the first congressional appropriation was made to the program in the form of $3.9 million. In 1991, the United States Environmental Protection Agency (EPA) dedicated $1 million to a joint EPA and USDA subproject of SARE entitled Agriculture in Concert with the Environment.

1990s

In the early 1990s, SARE created a national outreach office to spread public awareness to their cause. They created publications to disperse that contained information on how to begin the conversion from traditional to sustainable agriculture methods.  Additionally, SARE began funding farmer-led research while Congress contributed funding to a SARE Professional Development Program, which provides members of the agriculture industry with training, grants, and resources to build awareness, knowledge, and skills related to sustainable agriculture practices.

In the late 1990s, national attention began to be brought to sustainable and organic agriculture methods. The program began to shift its focus towards marketing, local production, and the use of efficient, renewable energy sources on farms. The Secretary of Agriculture was influenced by the program to issue a memorandum pledging to make sustainability a key focus of all USDA policies and programs. The USDA National Agroforestry Center co-funded a program that lasted for 6 years, which assisted farmers in the development of agroforestry plans. Meanwhile, SARE furthered their funding of research on revolutionary agricultural methods and technology by awarding grants to graduate students' research projects nationwide.

2000s

On November 18, 2000, the program supported the Smithsonian National Museum of Natural History in their opening of an exhibit entitled "Listening to the Prairie: Farming in Nature's Image". The exhibit featured the techniques used by farmers to maximize their output while preserving the surrounding prairies. It ran until March 31, 2001.

In 2008, SARE celebrated its 20th anniversary. To that date, the program had funded 3,700 projects and was operating with an annual budget of approximately $19 million.

The Four Regions

North Central

The North Central region of SARE includes: Illinois, Iowa, Kansas, Michigan, Minnesota, Missouri, Nebraska, North Dakota, Ohio, South Dakota, and Wisconsin.

Northeast

The Northeast region of SARE includes: Connecticut, Delaware, Maine, Maryland, Massachusetts, New Hampshire, New Jersey, New York, Pennsylvania, Rhode Island, Vermont, West Virginia, and Washington, D.C.

South

The Southern region of SARE includes: Alabama, Arkansas, Florida, Georgia, Kentucky, Louisiana, Mississippi, North Carolina, Oklahoma, Puerto Rico, South Carolina, Tennessee, Texas, U.S. Virgin Islands, and Virginia.

West

The Western region of SARE includes: Alaska, American Samoa, Arizona, California, Colorado, Federated States of Micronesia, Guam, Hawaii, Idaho, Montana, Nevada, New Mexico, Oregon, Utah, Washington, and Wyoming.

Evaluation of the program's effectiveness

As of 2008, 64% of farmers who had received SARE grants stated that they had been able to earn increased profits as a result of the funding they received and utilization of sustainable agriculture methods. Additionally, 79% of grantees said that they had experienced a significant improvement in soil quality through the environmental friendly, sustainable methods that they were utilizing on their farms.

References

Sustainable agriculture